Tōryū Kenji (born 19 December 1958 as Kenji Tanaka) is a former sumo wrestler from Kakogawa, Hyōgo, Japan. He made his professional debut in March 1974, and reached the top division in November 1979. His highest rank was sekiwake. He retired in January 1990.

Career record

See also
Glossary of sumo terms
List of past sumo wrestlers
List of sekiwake

References

1958 births
Living people
Japanese sumo wrestlers
Sumo people from Hyōgo Prefecture
Sekiwake